Sandra Aleksejeva (born 3 May 1991) is a Latvian BMX racer. She competed at the 2012 Summer Olympics in London, reaching the semi final. Aleksejeva has participated in several European and World Championships. Aleksejeva was born in Krāslava, Latvia.

References

External links
 
 
 
 
 

1991 births
Living people
BMX riders
Latvian female cyclists
Olympic cyclists of Latvia
Cyclists at the 2012 Summer Olympics
European Games competitors for Latvia
Cyclists at the 2015 European Games
People from Krāslava